Giorgio Pessina (16 June 1902 – 18 July 1977) was an Italian fencer. He won a gold medal at the 1928 Summer Olympics and a silver at the 1932 Summer Olympics.

References

External links
 

1902 births
1977 deaths
Italian male fencers
Olympic fencers of Italy
Fencers at the 1924 Summer Olympics
Fencers at the 1928 Summer Olympics
Fencers at the 1932 Summer Olympics
Olympic gold medalists for Italy
Olympic silver medalists for Italy
Olympic medalists in fencing
Fencers from Rome
Medalists at the 1928 Summer Olympics
Medalists at the 1932 Summer Olympics